The Golden Reel Award for Outstanding Achievement in Sound Editing - Sound Effects, Foley, Dialogue and ADR for Foreign Language Feature Film is an annual award given by the Motion Picture Sound Editors. It honors sound editors whose work has warranted merit in the field of cinema; in this case, their work in the field of non-English language film. It was first awarded in 1983, for films released the previous year, but was separated into two categories: Best Sound Editing - Foreign Feature - Dialogue and Best Sound Editing - Foreign Feature - Sound Effects This was amended in 1985, when ADR and sound effects were combined for the category Best Sound Editing - Foreign Feature. It was not until 2018, when this award was first given under its current title, that this category awarded, exclusively, non-English language films. Previously, the award was given to either foreign language films and/or English language films produced outside of the United States.

Winners and nominees

1980s
Best Sound Editing - Foreign Feature - Dialogue

Best Sound Editing - Foreign Feature - Sound Effects

Best Sound Editing - Foreign Feature

1990s

2000s

Best Sound Editing for Sound Effects and Foley in a Foreign Film

Best Sound Editing - Sound Effects, Foley, Dialogue & ADR in a Foreign Feature Film

2010s
Best Sound Editing - Sound Effects, Foley, Dialogue and ADR in a Feature Foreign Language Film

Best Sound Editing - Sound Effects, Foley, Dialogue and ADR in a Foreign Feature Film

Best Sound Editing - Sound Effects, Foley, Dialogue, and ADR in a Foreign Language Feature

Outstanding Achievement in Sound Editing - Sound Effects, Foley, Dialogue and ADR for Foreign Language Feature Film

2020s

External links
Official MPSE Website

References

Golden Reel Awards (Motion Picture Sound Editors)